Shishupal Ram was an Indian pediatrician. Born in the Indian state of Bihar, he was a graduate of the Patna Medical College. The Government of India awarded him the fourth highest Indian civilian honour of Padma Shri in 1983. He died on 29 October 2011 at the age of 84.

See also

 Pediatrics

References

Recipients of the Padma Shri in medicine
Year of birth missing
1920s births
2011 deaths
Indian paediatricians
Patna University alumni
20th-century Indian medical doctors
Scientists from Patna
Medical doctors from Bihar